In law, a hearing is a proceeding before a court or other decision-making body or officer, such as a government agency or a legislative committee.

Description
A hearing is generally distinguished from a trial in that it is usually shorter and often less formal.

In the course of litigation, hearings are conducted as oral arguments in support of motions, whether to resolve the case without further trial on a motion to dismiss or for summary judgment, or to decide discrete issues of law, such as the admissibility of evidence, that will determine how the trial proceeds.  Limited evidence and testimony may also be presented in hearings to supplement the legal arguments.

Types
Terminology varies from country to country, and there are different types of hearings under different legal systems.

A preliminary hearing (also known as evidentiary hearing, probable cause hearing, and other variant terms) is a proceeding, after a criminal complaint has been filed by the prosecutor, to determine whether there is enough evidence to require a trial.

Australia 
A hearing is a part of the court process in Australia. There are different types of hearing in a case. There may be several hearings, although not all may be scheduled. These include:

court mentions, where a case first is heard in court; and/or
directions hearing(s) (a brief hearing in front of a judge or commissioner); and
a contest mention, where disputed issues are resolved, this is the part of the hearing where evidence may be adduced (the process of putting forward or presenting evidence or arguments for consideration by the court); a "type of pre-trial hearing which aims to facilitate early guilty pleas and narrow the issues in dispute".

United Kingdom
A hearing is a part of the court process in England and Wales. The term "rolled-up hearing" is also used, referring to occasions when permission is considered for a procedural application on the basis that, if permission is granted, the substantive application will be heard immediately afterwards.

United States

Congressional hearing
Unofficial hearing

In the United States, one aspect of the "due process revolution" is that many administrative decisions that were once made much less formally must now be preceded by a hearing. An important step in this development was the Supreme Court decision in Goldberg v. Kelly, 397 U.S. 254 (1970). There the Court held that an agency could not terminate a recipient's welfare benefits without a pre-termination hearing. The decision also illustrated that what constitutes a "hearing" can depend on the context. In Goldberg, the goal of a speedy decision was held to "justify the limitation of the pre-termination hearing to minimum procedural safeguards", which included such basic matters as the right to appear and to cross-examine witnesses, but did not include "a complete record and a comprehensive opinion".

See also
Continuance
Due process
Jury trial
Lawsuit (another type of legal proceeding)
Right to a fair trial
Rule of law
Trial by ordeal

References

Legal procedure
Legal action